Mian Muhammad Sharif (18 November 1919 – 19 October 2004) was a Pakistani businessman who is known as the co-founder of Ittefaq Group and founder of Sharif Group. Two of his three  sons, Nawaz and Shehbaz became Prime Ministers of Pakistan.

Early life and family

Sharif was born in 1919 to Mian Mohammad Baksh, into a Butt trader family in Jati Umra (Amritsar) to ancestors who migrated from Anantnag in Jammu and Kashmir. He was one among seven brothers. According to credible sources, he did his schooling in eastern Punjab, then he moved to Lahore for his college education, he studied in DAV College, Lahore. In 1936, the family relocated to Lahore for better economic opportunities. Sharif started a steel factory in Lahore with a Hindu businessman. He later attributed most of his success and learnings to the caring and generosity of said businessman.

In 1939, Sharif founded a small steel foundry after selling his farming land. His business was among the largest businesses in Punjab, only after BECO Engineering. In 1973 PM Bhutto nationalized his factories and Main Shareef established a steel factory in Dubai.

He was married to Shamim Akhtar, with whom he had three sons. All his children became politicians, Nawaz Sharif, Shehbaz Sharif and Abbas Sharif. He developed a welfare project, Sharif Medical City, in Raiwind, Allama Iqbal Town, Lahore.

Death
In 2000, Sharif's family was exiled to Saudi Arabia by then Chief of Army Staff Pervez Musharraf. He died of a cardiac arrest in Jeddah, in 19 October 2004, at the age of 84. Sharif was suffering from chronic heart disease and underwent angioplasty twice. In 1982, he had his first heart bypass. His funeral took place in Masjid al-Haram on 30 October 2004. He is buried in Raiwind, Allama Iqbal Town, Lahore.

References

1919 births
2004 deaths
Pakistani Muslims
People from Amritsar district
People from Punjab, Pakistan
People from Raiwind
Sharif family
Tablighi Jamaat people